HMS Zambesi was a Z-class destroyer. She has been the only Royal Navy warship to bear that name.  She was launched on 21 December 1942 at the Cammell Laird shipyard at Birkenhead and commissioned on 18 July 1944.  She was 'adopted' by the civil community of Bromley, as part of Warship Week in 1942.

Second World War
She escorted a number of Arctic convoys, and other operations in the North Sea and off the coast of Scandinavia. As the war reached its end Zambesi was deployed with the Home Fleet to support operations to re-occupy countries previously under German occupation, and this included guardship duties.

Postwar
After the end of the war Zambesi joined the 4th Destroyer Flotilla in which she served until 1947 when she was paid-off and was reduced to reserve status in the Plymouth Reserve Fleet. She remained in reserve until 1950, though received a refit at Gibraltar in 1948. In 1951 she was a target ship for the 3rd Submarine Flotilla, based at Rothesay. Between 1953 and 1954 she was given a refit at Penarth, before being held at reserve at Cardiff until 1959.

Decommissioning and disposal
In 1959 Zambesi was placed on the Sale List and she was sold to Thos. W. Ward for breaking-up. On 12 February 1959 she arrived in tow at their yard at Briton Ferry, Wales.

Zambesis bell was presented to St Cuthbert's Church in Portsmouth in 1959, where it still survives.

References

Publications

External links
 HMS Zambesis career

 

W and Z-class destroyers
Ships built on the River Mersey
1943 ships
World War II destroyers of the United Kingdom